Hit the Ice is an ice hockey sports video game originally released by Taito, Williams and Midway for arcades in 1990. The game is a cartoonish representation of the sport with three players on each team: forward, defense, and goalie. There are few rules, as players are encouraged to trip, elbow and kick opponents.

Taito released ports of Hit the Ice for the PC Engine/TurboGrafx-16, Mega Drive/Genesis, Game Boy and Super NES. An NES version was developed but not released.

Gameplay

Hit the Ice is based on the game of ice hockey, the aim of the game being to outscore one's opponent by shooting the puck into the opponent's net more often than the opponent over three periods of play.

The game is unique because instead of having six players per team (like Konami's Blades of Steel), the game only has three (forward, defense, and goalie). In the arcade version there are only two teams (Red and Blue) and players can be chosen for each position.

During games, there are very few rules.  Players have special moves, most of which are illegal moves in actual ice hockey (such as slashing, tripping, elbowing, or kicking opponents in the groin). Fights are common, though a player losing a fight is not penalized.  Instead, he becomes sluggish for a short period.  If the player loses several fights in one period, he leaves the game with an injury.

Every player is capable of a "super shot", which must be charged beforehand.  If allowed to charge and shoot, the shot will hit the goaltender with such force that he is knocked back into the net along with the puck, counting as a goal.  If a team is far enough behind, his team may receive a power-up in the form of a "super drink", making the stick of the player who consumes it flash with energy and turning every shot into a super shot for a short time.

Players
Iven Yakashev, spoof of a Soviet player from 1972
Phil Bunger, spoof of Phil Esposito
"Dicky" Fontaine, spoof of Dickie Moore
Al Gigliano
Johnny Novak
"Happy" Golecki ("happy-go-lucky")
Pierre Bourdoir
Ben Dover
"Gunner" Hall, spoof of Glenn Hall
"Battleship" Boyd
Reggie Marsh
"Bo" Cleveland

Reception 
The arcade game was a hit in the United States, where weekly coin drop earnings averaged $192.25 per arcade unit during November and December 1990.

In the United Kingdom, Hit the Ice was the top-selling PC Engine game in October 1991.

See also 
2 on 2 Open Ice Challenge

References

External links

"Hit the Ice" at the PC Engine Software Bible
Information about the unreleased NES version
Hit the Ice can be played for free in the browser on the Internet Archive

1990 video games
Arcade video games
Game Boy games
Cancelled Nintendo Entertainment System games
Ice hockey video games
Midway video games
Multiplayer and single-player video games
Sega Genesis games
Super Nintendo Entertainment System games
TurboGrafx-16 games
Williams video games
Sports video games set in the United States
Video games set in Canada
Taito arcade games
Taito B System games
Video games developed in Japan